The 1901 Beloit football team represented Beloit College as an independent during the 1901 college football season. In its sixth season under head coach John W. Hollister, the team compiled a 5–3–3 record.

Under coach Hollister, Beloit was considered one of the major football teams in the Midwest, scheduling games against the region's premiere programs. The 1901 team played tie games with Kansas, Chicago (coached by Amos Alonzo Stagg), and Northwestern and lost by only five points to Notre Dame. In one of the worst defeats in program history, Beloit lost to national champion Michigan by an 89–0 score.

The team played its home games at Keep Athletic Field in Beloit, Wisconsin.

Schedule

References

Beloit
Beloit Buccaneers football seasons
Beloit football